Bernard James Mullin (born 3 May 1949) is a published author and the former Chief Executive Officer of Atlanta Spirit. He is currently a director of The Aspire Group.

Early life and education 
Mullin was born 3 May 1949 in Liverpool, England. He attended Coventry University and graduated with a B.A. in business studies.

Personal life 
Mullin is a known Everton fan. In March 2011 it was reported that he was attempting to form a consortium to buy the club.

Bibliography 
Sport Marketing

References

External links 
 Aspire Group Inc.
 Profile at LinkedIn

1949 births
Living people
Footballers from Liverpool
Oxford City F.C. players
Atlanta Hawks executives
Atlanta Thrashers executives
British writers
Association footballers not categorized by position
Association football players not categorized by nationality